The 1996 OFC Nations Cup was not held as a cohesive tournament, but consisted of semi-finals and a final played on a two-legged basis, stretched out between November 1995 and November 1996.

The four participating teams were Australia and New Zealand who qualified as of right, Solomon Islands who qualified as Melanesia Cup holders, and Tahiti who qualified as Polynesia Cup holders.

The semifinals between Australia and New Zealand was also valid for the 1995 Trans-Tasman Cup.

Qualification

Melanesia Cup 1994

Solomon Islands qualified.

Polynesia Cup 1994

Tahiti qualified.

Final tournament

Semifinals

Australia won 3–0 on aggregate.

Tahiti won 3–1 on aggregate.

Final

Australia won 11–0 on aggregate.

Goalscorers
7 goals
  Kris Trajanovski
2 goals

  Jean-Loup Rousseau

1 goal

  Damian Mori
  Ernie Tapai
  Joe Spiteri
  Paul Trimboli
  Paul Wade
  Robbie Hooker
  Robert Seni
  Macha Gatien

Own goal
  Rupena Raumati (playing against Australia)

References
 RSSSF Accessed 21 February 2010.

 
Nations
Nations
OFC Nations Cup tournaments
International association football competitions hosted by New Zealand
International association football competitions hosted by Australia
Ofc Nations Cup
Ofc Nations Cup